Abdulkarim Lukman (born 6 September 1990) is a Nigerian football midfielder playing for Yemeni club Shabab Al Jeel.

Club career
Born in Jos, Lukman still teenager debuted professionally in Israel, playing with Hakoah Amidar Ramat Gan F.C. in the 2008–09 Israeli Premier League.

He spent some time back in Nigeria and with Sunshine Stars F.C. in 2013 and 2014.

Since 2014 he has been playing in Yemen with Shabab Al Jeel.

Some websites such as zerozero.pt, as of 11 November 2016, confuse him with Abengunrin Lukman Adefemi, who played with Crown F.C. in 2013 and FK Javor Ivanjica in 2013–14.

International career
He was part of the Nigerian tournament winning team at the 2007 FIFA U-17 World Cup played in South Korea. He made 4 appearances.

Honours
National team
Nigeria U17
FIFA U-17 World Cup: 2007

References

External links
 
 
 

1990 births
Living people
Sportspeople from Jos
Nigerian footballers
Nigerian expatriate footballers
Sunshine Stars F.C. players
Israeli Premier League players
Nigerian expatriate sportspeople in Israel
Nigerian expatriate sportspeople in Yemen
Expatriate footballers in Israel
Expatriate footballers in Yemen
Association football midfielders